is a railway station in the town of Karuizawa, Nagano, Japan, operated jointly by the JR Group company East Japan Railway Company (JR East) and the third-sector railway operator Shinano Railway.

Lines
Karuizawa Station is served by the JR East Hokuriku Shinkansen high-speed line from Tokyo to  via . On the Shinkansen line, it is located 146.8 kilometers from Tokyo Station. It is also a terminal station for the 65.1 kilometer Shinano Railway Line which operates between Karuizawa and Nagano.

Station layout
The JR portion of the station has two elevated island platforms, serving four tracks, with the station building underneath. The station has a Midori no Madoguchi staffed ticket office. The Shinano Railway portion of the station has one ground-level island platform serving two tracks, connected to the JR East portion of the station by a footbridge.

JR East platforms

Shinano Railway platforms

History

At Karuizawa, all trains were coupled with or separated from helper locomotives that were required for all trains to go through the Usui Pass section.

When the Japanese National Railways (JNR) were divided and privatized on April 1, 1987, Shinetsu Main Line became a part of the system of East Japan Railway Company (JR East). On October 1, 1997, JR East opened the Nagano Shinkansen with a stop at Karuizawa. Since then, Karuizawa Station has been shared by JR East and Shinano Railway.

Passenger statistics
In fiscal 2015, the JR East portion of the station was used by an average of 2,889 passengers daily (boarding passengers only).

Surrounding area
 Karuizawa Prince Shopping Plaza
 Karuizawa Prince Hotel Ski Resort

Hotels
 Karuizawa Prince Hotel
 Mampei Hotel
 Mikasa Hotel

Bus routes
Track 1
Seibu Kanko Bus
For Manza-Kazawaguchi Station
For Manza Onsen and Shirane Kazan
Track 2
Kusakaru Kotsu 
For Kita-Karuizawa
For Naganohara-Kusatsuguchi Station
For Kusatsu Onsen Bus Terminal
Track 3
Seibu Bus and Chikuma Bus
For Kawagoe Matoba, Nerima Station and Ikebukuro Station
For Tamagawa-Josui Station and Tachikawa Station
Tokyu Bus
For Shibuya Station and Futako-tamagawa Station
Kintetsu Bus
For Namba Station
Track 4
Community bus
Around Karuizawa Town
Track 5
JR BUS KANTO Usui Line
For Yokokawa Station
This bus route passes through Megane Bridge during autumn.
North Exit
Shoei Kotsu
For Nagano Station and Suzaka Station
For Shinjuku Station and Tokyo Station

Gallery

See also
 List of railway stations in Japan

References

External links

 JR East Karuizawa Station 
 Shinano Railway Karuizawa Station 

Railway stations in Nagano Prefecture
Stations of East Japan Railway Company
Hokuriku Shinkansen
Shinano Railway Line
Railway stations in Japan opened in 1888
Karuizawa, Nagano